Eupoecilia angustana is a moth of the family Tortricidae. It is found in most of Europe to the southern part of the Urals, and across the Palearctic to China (Anhui, Beijing, Gansu, Heilongijiang, Henan, Jilin, Ningxia, Shaanxi, Shandong, Shanxi), Japan and Korea.

The wingspan is 10–15 mm.The forewings are mainly ochre-coloured and white.There is a fairly wide, V-shaped discal cross-band that is dark-grey front and back and brown orange in the middle. The outer edge is dark grey. The hindwings are light grey-brown, darker towards the outer edge.

The moth flies from June to September.

The larvae feed on Plantago, Achillea, Calluna, Origanum, Thymus and Solidago.

Subspecies
Eupoecilia angustana thuleana is considered a distinct subspecies by some authors. It is found in Shetland.

References

External links
UKmoths

Eupoecilia
Moths described in 1799
Moths of Japan
Moths of Europe
Moths of Asia